U.S. Career Institute (USCI) is a private, accredited distance learning, educational institution based in Fort Collins, Colorado.

U.S. Career Institute offers self-paced certificate and associate degree programs. These programs focus on vocational and career-oriented subject areas. Courses are via distance learning and can be taken from any geographical location.

U.S. Career Institute is owned and operated by Weston Distance Learning, Inc., which was founded in 1981.

Students enrolling in the institution receive personal home-study training, via correspondence or online. All courses are self-paced.

Accreditation
U.S. Career Institute is nationally accredited by the Distance Education Accreditation Commission (DEAC), a nationally recognized accrediting agency which is approved by the U.S. Department of Education (USDE) and recognized by the Council for Higher Education Accreditation (CHEA). U.S. Career Institute is also an Accredited Member of the Better Business Bureau with an A+ rating.

References

External links
Official U.S. Career Institute site
Weston Distance Learning, Inc.
USCI Better Business Bureau Verification

Educational organizations based in the United States